These are the details relating to the 2008 Chinese football season.

Overview

Domestic champions

International results

Domestic competitions

2008 Chinese Super League

2008 China League One

2008 China League Two

Southern Group

Northern Group

Play-offs

Guangdong Sunray Cave won 4–1 on aggregate and promoted to China League One 2009.

Shenyang Dongjin 1–1 China Three Gorges University on aggregate. Shenyang Dongjin won 4–3 on penalties and promoted to China League One 2009.

China League Three 2008
Final: Wuhan Dongfeng Honda 6–1 Hunchun Procuratorate

Youth competitions

Women's competitions

Futsal competitions

Beach soccer competitions

International clubs competitions

AFC Champions League 2008

National teams competitions

Men's senior team

2010 FIFA World Cup qualification (AFC)

East Asian Cup 2008
All times local (GMT+8)

Friendly matches

Men's U-23 team

Football at the 2008 Summer Olympics – Men's tournament

Men's U-20 team

AFC U-19 Championship 2008

AFF U19 Youth Championship 2008

Third place match

Men's U-17 team

AFC U-16 Championship 2008

Women's senior team

Football at the 2008 Summer Olympics – Women's tournament

2008 AFC Women's Asian Cup

2008 Algarve Cup

Women's East Asian Cup 2008

Women's U-20 team

2008 FIFA U-20 Women's World Cup

Women's U-17 team

AFC U-16 Women's Championship 2009 qualification

Futsal team

2008 FIFA Futsal World Cup

2008 AFC Futsal Championship

KL World 5's Futsal 2008
''See details

Beach soccer team

AFC Beach Soccer Championship 2008
Group stage
China 4–3 Uzbekistan
UAE 5–0 China

Semi-final
Japan 7–1 China

Third place final
Iran 4–1 China

Beach soccer at the 2008 Asian Beach Games

Disability teams

Football 5-a-side at the 2008 Summer Paralympics

Football 7-a-side at the 2008 Summer Paralympics

See also

 
Seasons in Chinese football
China
Football